Adrian De Wet Vermeulen (born ) is a former South African professional rugby union player who played first class rugby with the  in 2015 and 2016. His regular position was at centre, and he occasionally played as a winger.

Rugby career

2009–2015: Youth and Varsity Cup rugby

Vermeulen was born in Johannesburg and grew up in nearby Krugersdorp. He was not selected to represent his local provincial union, the, at high school level, but made one appearance for the team, coming on as a replacement in their match against in the 2009 Under-19 Provincial Championship.

Vermeulen played rugby for the University of Johannesburg, being named in their squads for the national inter-university competition – the Varsity Cup – from 2012 to 2015. He failed to play in any of their matches in 2014, but started all seven of their matches in the 2015 competition in the inside centre position.

2015–2016: Leopards

The Leopards' five wins in their six matches were not enough to top the log; they finished one point behind  to fail to qualify to the Currie Cup Premier Division, instead playing in the Currie Cup First Division. Vermeulen started the semi-final, as the Leopards faced the Falcons for a second consecutive week, again beating the team from the East Rand.

Vermeulen had another full season with the Leopards in 2016. He made eight starts in their Currie Cup qualification campaign, with tries against the Griffons and SWD Eagles not enough to secure a Currie Cup Premier Division spot, instead again qualifying to the First Division. Vermeulen started all five their matches in the First Division regular season, scoring tries against the Falcons and SWD Eagles as the team again topped the log with an unbeaten record. He helped them to a 40–30 victory over the Falcons in the semi-final, and also started the final against the Griffons. He scored their first try of the match in the 28th minute, before a head injury forced him off just before half-time, as the Leopards lost the match 25–44 to finish as runners-up.

Vermeulen failed to sufficiently recover from the injury he sustained in the final and he retired from professional rugby in January 2017 on medical advice. He made a total of 28 first class appearances during his time at the Leopards, scoring ten tries and winning the Currie Cup First Division title in 2015.

References

Alumni of Monument High School
South African rugby union players
Living people
1990 births
Rugby union players from Johannesburg
Rugby union centres
Rugby union wings
Leopards (rugby union) players